The 2009 Yomiuri Giants season was the 76th season for the Yomiuri Giants franchise.

Regular season

Standings

Record vs. opponents

Game log

|-align="center" bgcolor="#ffbbbb"
| 1 || April 3 || Carp || 3–6 || Lewis (1–0) || Greisinger (0–1) || Nagakawa (1) || 44,124 || 0–1–0
|-align="center" bgcolor="#ffbbbb"
| 2 || April 4 || Carp || 3–5 || Maeda (1–0) || Nakamura (0–1) || Nagakawa (2) || 42,650 || 0–2–0
|-align="center" bgcolor="#ffeeaa"
| 3 || April 5 || Carp || 1–1 (12) || colspan=3|Game tied after 12 innings || 42,275 || 0–2–1
|-align="center" bgcolor="bbffbb"
| 4 || April 7 || @ BayStars || 1–5 || Takahashi (1–0) || Terahara (0–1) ||  || 20,168 || 1–2–1
|-align="center" bgcolor="bbffbb"
| 5 || April 8 || @ BayStars || 1–12 || Fukuda (1–0) || Kudoh (0–1) ||  || 16,361 || 2–2–1
|-align="center" bgcolor="bbffbb"
| 6 || April 9 || @ BayStars || 2–9 || Greisinger (1–1) || Walrond (0–1) ||  || 16,691 || 3–2–1
|-align="center" bgcolor="bbffbb"
| 7 || April 10 || Tigers || 6–5 || Ochi (1–0) || Egusa (1–1) || Kroon (1) || 43,356 || 4–2–1
|-align="center" bgcolor="bbffbb"
| 8 || April 11 || Tigers || 4–1 || Tono (1–0) || Nomi (0–2) || Kroon (2) || 44,284 || 5–2–1
|-align="center" bgcolor="#ffeeaa"
| 9 || April 12 || Tigers || 6–6 (12) || colspan=3|Game tied after 12 innings || 44,246 || 5–2–2
|-align="center" bgcolor="#bbbbbb"
| — || April 14 || @ Swallows || colspan=6|Game postponed due to rain
|-align="center" bgcolor="bbffbb"
| 10 || April 15 || @ Swallows || 2–6 || Greisinger (2–1) || Kida (1–1) ||  || 20,072 || 6–2–2
|-align="center" bgcolor="#ffbbbb"
| 11 || April 16 || @ Swallows || 6–2 || Tateyama (1–0) || Utsumi (0–1) ||  || 16,592 || 6–3–2
|-align="center" bgcolor="bbffbb"
| 12 || April 17 || @ Dragons || 3–5 || Tono (2–0) || Yoshimi (2–1) || Kroon (3) || 35,669 || 7–3–2
|-align="center" bgcolor="bbffbb"
| 13 || April 18 || @ Dragons || 2–3 || Yamaguchi (1–0) || Chen (1–1) || Kroon (4) || 37,883 || 8–3–2
|-align="center" bgcolor="bbffbb"
| 14 || April 19 || @ Dragons || 5–6 || Nishimura (1–0) || Nelson (0–1) || Kroon (5) || 37,815 || 9–3–2
|-align="center" bgcolor="bbffbb"
| 15 || April 21 || Swallows || 4–0 || Greisinger (3–1) || Kida (1–2) ||  || 20,817 || 10–3–2
|-align="center" bgcolor="bbffbb"
| 16 || April 22 || Swallows || 3–2 || Yamaguchi (2–0) || Igarashi (0–1) || Kroon (6) || 15,876 || 11–3–2
|-align="center" bgcolor="bbffbb"
| 17 || April 23 || Swallows || 2–1 || Ochi (2–0) || Oshimoto (0–2) ||  || 20,120 || 12–3–2
|-align="center" bgcolor="#ffbbbb"
| 18 || April 24 || Dragons || 2–3 (10) || Kobayashi (1–0) || Ochi (2–1) || Iwase (5) || 42,262 || 12–4–2
|-align="center" bgcolor="bbffbb"
| 19 || April 25 || Dragons || 5–4 || Toyoda (1–0) || Iwase (0–1) ||  || 43,707 || 13–4–2
|-align="center" bgcolor="#ffbbbb"
| 20 || April 26 || Dragons || 0–8 || Kawai (1–0) || Greisinger (3–2) ||  || 43,020 || 13–5–2
|-align="center" bgcolor="#ffbbbb"
| 21 || April 28 || @ Carp || 5–0 || Otake (1–1) || Utsumi (0–2) ||  || 24,423 || 13–6–2
|-align="center" bgcolor="#ffbbbb"
| 22 || April 29 || @ Carp || 2–0 || Saito (2–1) || Tono (2–1) || Nagakawa (8) || 31,773 || 13–7–2
|-align="center" bgcolor="bbffbb"
| 23 || April 30 || @ Carp || 4–7 || Fukuda (2–0) || Maeda (2–3) || Ochi (1) || 26,322 || 14–7–2
|-

|-align="center" bgcolor="bbffbb"
| 24 || May 2 || @ Tigers || 5–6 || Yamaguchi (3–0) || Fujikawa (1–1) || Ochi (2) || 46,425 || 15–7–2 
|-align="center" bgcolor="bbffbb"
| 25 || May 3 || @ Tigers || 0–4 || Gonzalez (1–0) || Cheng (0–1) ||  || 46,440 || 16–7–2
|-align="center" bgcolor="#ffbbbb"
| 26 || May 4 || @ Tigers || 6–0 || Shimoyanagi (2–2) || Utsumi (0–3) ||  || 46,434 || 16–8–2
|-align="center" bgcolor="#ffbbbb"
| 27 || May 5 || BayStars || 4–6 || Walrond (2–2) || Tono (2–2) || Yamaguchi (1) || 45,835 || 16–9–2
|-align="center" bgcolor="bbffbb"
| 28 || May 6 || BayStars || 3–2 || Yamaguchi (4–0) || Sanada (0–1) ||  || 43,182 || 17–9–2
|-align="center" bgcolor="bbffbb"
| 29 || May 7 || BayStars || 7–3 || Nishimura (2–0) || Yamaguchi (2–1) ||  || 40,139 || 18–9–2
|-align="center" bgcolor="bbffbb"
| 30 || May 8 || Dragons || 10–4 || Greisinger (4–2) || Yamai (0–2) ||  || 42,927 || 19–9–2
|-align="center" bgcolor="bbffbb"
| 31 || May 9 || Dragons || 3–1 || Gonzalez (2–0) || Chen (2–2) || Ochi (3) || 42,047 || 20–9–2
|-align="center" bgcolor="bbffbb"
| 32 || May 10 || Dragons || 8–7 || Nakamura (1–1) || Saito (2–1) || Ochi (4) || 43,185 || 21–9–2
|-align="center" bgcolor="bbffbb"
| 33 || May 12 || @ BayStars || 3–5 || Takahashi (2–0) || Walrond (2–3) || Ochi (5) || 19,691 || 22–9–2
|-align="center" bgcolor="#ffbbbb"
| 34 || May 13 || @ BayStars || 9–8 || Yamaguchi (3–1) || Toyoda (1–1) ||  || 20,412 || 22–10–2
|-align="center" bgcolor="bbffbb"
| 35 || May 14 || @ BayStars || 5–9 || Greisinger (5–2) || Fujie (0–1) ||  || 19,279 || 23–10–2
|-align="center" bgcolor="bbffbb"
| 36 || May 15 || @ Carp || 2–5 || Gonzalez (3–0) || Aoki (0–2) || Kroon (7) || 30,164 || 24–10–2
|-align="center" bgcolor="#ffeeaa"
| 37 || May 16 || @ Carp || 0–0 (12) || colspan=3|Game tied after 12 innings || 29,794 || 24–10–3
|-align="center" bgcolor="bbffbb"
| 38 || May 17 || @ Carp || 1–2 || Ochi (3–1) || Nagakawa (0–3) || Kroon (8) || 29,707 || 25–10–3
|-align="center" bgcolor="#ffbbbb"
| 39 || May 19 || @ Fighters || 16–6 || Yagi (4–0) || Takahashi (2–1) ||  || 33,050 || 25–11–3
|-align="center" bgcolor="#ffbbbb"
| 40 || May 20 || @ Fighters || 6–5 || Hayashi (1–0) || Greisinger (5–3) || Takeda (10) || 33,602 || 25–12–3
|-align="center" bgcolor="bbffbb"
| 41 || May 22 || @ Eagles || 2–12 || Gonzalez (4–0) || Nagai (3–2) ||  || 20,170 || 26–12–3
|-align="center" bgcolor="bbffbb"
| 42 || May 23 || @ Eagles || 1–7 || Utsumi (1–3) || Iwakuma (5–2) ||  || 20,599 || 27–12–3
|-align="center" bgcolor="#ffbbbb"
| 43 || May 24 || Buffaloes || 6–8 || Hirano (1–1) || Tono (2–3) ||  || 42,110 || 27–13–3
|-align="center" bgcolor="bbffbb"
| 44 || May 25 || Buffaloes || 6–2 || Takahashi (3–1) || Kondo (3–4) ||  || 40,057 || 28–13–3
|-align="center" bgcolor="#ffbbbb"
| 45 || May 27 || Hawks || 3–5 || Houlton (3–3) || Greisinger (5–4) || Mahara (9) || 43,050 || 28–14–3
|-align="center" bgcolor="bbffbb"
| 46 || May 28 || Hawks || 8–2 || Gonzalez (5–0) || Wada (3–3) ||  || 42,218 || 29–14–3
|-align="center" bgcolor="#ffeeaa"
| 47 || May 30 || @ Lions || 2–2 (12) || colspan=3|Game tied after 12 innings || 33,778 || 29–14–4
|-align="center" bgcolor="#ffbbbb"
| 48 || May 31 || @ Lions || 3–2 (10) || Onodera (2–2) || Kroon (0–1) ||  || 33,173 || 29–15–4
|-

|-align="center" bgcolor="#ffeeaa"
| 49 || June 2 || @ Marines || 0–0 (12) || colspan=3|Game tied after 12 innings || 25,249 || 29–15–5
|-
| 50 || June 3 || @Marines ||  ||  ||  ||  ||  || 
|-
| 51 || June 5 || Fighters ||  ||  ||  ||  ||  || 
|-
| 52 || June 6 || Fighters ||  ||  ||  ||  ||  || 
|-
| 53 || June 7 || Eagles ||  ||  ||  ||  ||  || 
|-
| 54 || June 8 || Eagles ||  ||  ||  ||  ||  || 
|-
| 55 || June 10 || @Buffaloes ||  ||  ||  ||  ||  || 
|-
| 56 || June 11 || @Buffaloes ||  ||  ||  ||  ||  || 
|-
| 57 || June 13 || @Hawks ||  ||  ||  ||  ||  || 
|-
| 58 || June 14 || @Hawks ||  ||  ||  ||  ||  || 
|-
| 59 || June 16 || Lions ||  ||  ||  ||  ||  || 
|-
| 60 || June 17 || Lions ||  ||  ||  ||  ||  || 
|-
| 61 || June 20 || Marines ||  ||  ||  ||  ||  || 
|-
| 62 || June 21 || Marines ||  ||  ||  ||  ||  || 
|-
| 63 || June 26 || Swallows ||  ||  ||  ||  ||  || 
|-
| 64 || June 27 || Swallows ||  ||  ||  ||  ||  || 
|-
| 65 || June 28 || Swallows ||  ||  ||  ||  ||  || 
|-align="center" bgcolor="bbffbb"
| 66 || June 30 || @ Carp || 4–3 || ||  ||  ||  ||  || 
|-

|-
| 67 || July 1 || Carp ||  ||  ||  ||  ||  || 
|-
| 68 || July 2 || Carp ||  ||  ||  ||  ||  || 
|-
| 69 || July 3 || @Dragons ||  ||  ||  ||  ||  || 
|-
| 70 || July 4 || @Dragons ||  ||  ||  ||  ||  || 
|-
| 71 || July 5 || @Dragons ||  ||  ||  ||  ||  || 
|-
| 72 || July 7 || BayStars ||  ||  ||  ||  ||  || 
|-
| 73 || July 8 || BayStars ||  ||  ||  ||  ||  || 
|-
| 74 || July 9 || BayStars ||  ||  ||  ||  ||  || 
|-
| 75 || July 10 || @Tigers ||  ||  ||  ||  ||  || 
|-
| 76 || July 11 || @Tigers ||  ||  ||  ||  ||  || 
|-
| 77 || July 12 || @Tigers ||  ||  ||  ||  ||  || 
|-
| 78 || July 14 || @Swallows ||  ||  ||  ||  ||  || 
|-
| 79 || July 15 || @Swallows ||  ||  ||  ||  ||  || 
|-
| 80 || July 17 || Tigers ||  ||  ||  ||  ||  || 
|-
| 81 || July 18 || Tigers ||  ||  ||  ||  ||  || 
|-
| 82 || July 19 || Tigers ||  ||  ||  ||  ||  || 
|-
| 83 || July 20 || @BayStars ||  ||  ||  ||  ||  || 
|-
| 84 || July 21 || @BayStars ||  ||  ||  ||  ||  || 
|-
| 85 || July 22 || @BayStars ||  ||  ||  ||  ||  || 
|-
| 86 || July 28 || Dragons ||  ||  ||  ||  ||  || 
|-
| 87 || July 29 || Dragons ||  ||  ||  ||  ||  || 
|-
| 88 || July 30 || Dragons ||  ||  ||  ||  ||  || 
|-
| 89 || July 31 || @Tigers ||  ||  ||  ||  ||  || 
|-

|-
| 90 || August 1 || @Tigers ||  ||  ||  ||  ||  || 
|-
| 91 || August 2 || @Tigers ||  ||  ||  ||  ||  || 
|-
| 92 || August 4 || Carp ||  ||  ||  ||  ||  || 
|-
| 93 || August 5 || Carp ||  ||  ||  ||  ||  || 
|-
| 94 || August 7 || Swallows ||  ||  ||  ||  ||  || 
|-
| 95 || August 8 || Swallows ||  ||  ||  ||  ||  || 
|-
| 96 || August 9 || Swallows ||  ||  ||  ||  ||  || 
|-
| 97 || August 11 || @Carp ||  ||  ||  ||  ||  || 
|-
| 98 || August 12 || @Carp ||  ||  ||  ||  ||  || 
|-
| 99 || August 13 || @Carp ||  ||  ||  ||  ||  || 
|-
| 100 || August 14 || Tigers ||  ||  ||  ||  ||  || 
|-
| 101 || August 15 || Tigers ||  ||  ||  ||  ||  || 
|-
| 102 || August 16 || Tigers ||  ||  ||  ||  ||  || 
|-
| 103 || August 18 || BayStars ||  ||  ||  ||  ||  || 
|-
| 104 || August 19 || BayStars ||  ||  ||  ||  ||  || 
|-
| 105 || August 20 || BayStars ||  ||  ||  ||  ||  || 
|-
| 106 || August 21 || @Swallows ||  ||  ||  ||  ||  || 
|-
| 107 || August 22 || @Swallows ||  ||  ||  ||  ||  || 
|-
| 108 || August 23 || @Swallows ||  ||  ||  ||  ||  || 
|-
| 109 || August 25 || @Dragons ||  ||  ||  ||  ||  || 
|-
| 110 || August 26 || @Dragons ||  ||  ||  ||  ||  || 
|-
| 111 || August 27 || @Dragons ||  ||  ||  ||  ||  || 
|-
| 112 || August 28 || @Tigers ||  ||  ||  ||  ||  || 
|-
| 113 || August 29 || @Tigers ||  ||  ||  ||  ||  || 
|-
| 114 || August 30 || @Tigers ||  ||  ||  ||  ||  || 
|-

|-
| 115 || September 1 || BayStars ||  ||  ||  ||  ||  || 
|-
| 116 || September 2 || BayStars ||  ||  ||  ||  ||  || 
|-
| 117 || September 4 || Swallows ||  ||  ||  ||  ||  || 
|-
| 118 || September 5 || Swallows ||  ||  ||  ||  ||  || 
|-
| 119 || September 6 || Swallows ||  ||  ||  ||  ||  || 
|-
| 120 || September 8 || @BayStars ||  ||  ||  ||  ||  || 
|-
| 121 || September 9 || @BayStars ||  ||  ||  ||  ||  || 
|-
| 122 || September 10 || @BayStars ||  ||  ||  ||  ||  || 
|-
| 123 || September 11 || @Carp ||  ||  ||  ||  ||  || 
|-
| 124 || September 12 || @Carp ||  ||  ||  ||  ||  || 
|-
| 125 || September 13 || @Carp ||  ||  ||  ||  ||  || 
|-
| 126 || September 15 || Tigers ||  ||  ||  ||  ||  || 
|-
| 127 || September 16 || Tigers ||  ||  ||  ||  ||  || 
|-
| 128 || September 17 || Tigers ||  ||  ||  ||  ||  || 
|-
| 129 || September 18 || @Swallows ||  ||  ||  ||  ||  || 
|-
| 130 || September 19 || @Swallows ||  ||  ||  ||  ||  || 
|-
| 131 || September 20 || @Swallows ||  ||  ||  ||  ||  || 
|-
| 132 || September 21 || Dragons ||  ||  ||  ||  ||  || 
|-
| 133 || September 22 || Dragons ||  ||  ||  ||  ||  || 
|-
| 134 || September 23 || Dragons ||  ||  ||  ||  ||  || 
|-
| 135 || September 25 || Carp ||  ||  ||  ||  ||  || 
|-
| 136 || September 26 || Carp ||  ||  ||  ||  ||  || 
|-
| 137 || September 27 || Carp ||  ||  ||  ||  ||  || 
|-
| 138 || September 28 || @Dragons ||  ||  ||  ||  ||  || 
|-
| 139 || September 29 || @Dragons ||  ||  ||  ||  ||  || 
|-
| 140 || September 30 || @Dragons ||  ||  ||  ||  ||  || 
|-

Roster

Postseason

Climax Series

Stage 2

Game 1

Game 2

Game 3

Game 4

Japan Series

Game 1

Game 2

Game 3

Game 4

Game 5

Game 6

Player statistics

Batting

 Indicates CL leader in the category

 Indicates CL leader in the category

References

Yomiuri Giants
Yomiuri Giants seasons
Japan Series champion seasons